Triumph of Love is a 1938 Italian comedy film directed by Mario Mattoli and starring Paola Barbara.

Cast
 Paola Barbara as Giovanna
 Vittorio De Sica as Vincenzo
 Armando Migliari as Doctor
 Giuditta Rissone as Aunt Lucia
 Enrico Viarisio as Giangiacomo

References

External links

1938 films
Italian comedy films
1930s Italian-language films
1938 comedy films
Italian black-and-white films
Films directed by Mario Mattoli
1930s Italian films